Edwin Frederick Abbott (9 November 1908 – 3 May 1976) was a New Zealand rugby league footballer who represented New Zealand in 1930 and 1932.

Abbott was the nephew of 1905 All Black Harold Abbott and the uncle of Bill Deacon, a Kiwi from 1965 to 1971.

Playing career
From the Ngaruawahia Panthers club, Abbott represented South Auckland and the North Island. In 1930 he was selected for the New Zealand tour of New South Wales, playing in both matches against New South Wales and scoring three tries against Sydney Metropolis.

He played for South Auckland against both the 1928 and 1932 touring Great Britain Lions. In 1932 he played for New Zealand in two tests against Great Britain, scoring one try. In 1933 he moved to Auckland to join the Richmond Rovers club to play in the Auckland Rugby League competition joining Bert Cooke, the All Black who had joined Richmond the season prior.

References

1908 births
1976 deaths
New Zealand national rugby league team players
New Zealand rugby league players
Ngaruawahia Panthers players
North Island rugby league team players
Place of birth missing
Richmond Bulldogs players
Rugby league halfbacks
Waikato rugby league players
Waikato rugby league team players